Cosmic Thrill Seekers is the second studio album by American rock band Prince Daddy & The Hyena, released June 28, 2019 through CI. It was recorded at Ponderosa studios in Horse County, New Jersey with producer Nick "Scoops" Dardaris during January and February 2019.

Lead vocalist Kory Gregory states that the writing of the album took place over five years, including a full demo session recorded at University of North Carolina Asheville's studio through drummer Daniel Gorham's enrollment in their audio engineering program.

Musical themes 
Much of the album's lyrical content was written while vocalist and guitarist Kory Gregory had been suffering from severe anxiety following an acid trip.

Conceptually, the record mirrors The Wizard of Oz split into three acts: The Heart, The Brain, and The Roar. “We just want to make it sound like the soundtrack to a Disney film played by a punk rock band," says Gregory, citing My Chemical Romance and Green Day as influences.

Track listing

References

2019 albums
Counter Intuitive Records albums
Pop punk albums by American artists
Indie rock albums by American artists